Olivia Ann Nicholls (born 26 October 1994) is a British tennis player who specialises in doubles.

Nicholls has won one doubles title on the WTA Tour and 16 doubles titles on the ITF Circuit. On 9 January 2023, she peaked at No. 59 in the WTA doubles rankings.

Nicholls graduated from Loughborough University. At the 2017 Summer Universiade held in Taipei, Taiwan, she won the bronze medal in women's doubles, along with Emily Arbuthnott.

She made her WTA Tour debut at 2022 Lyon Open in the doubles draw, partnering with Alicia Barnett. The duo finished runners-up.

Biography
Olivia Nicholls was born on 26 October 1994 at the Norfolk and Norwich Hospital, the daughter of Ann Elizabeth Nicholls (née Mason) and Ian Phillip Nicholls. She has an older brother, Henry, a secondary school science teacher. Nicholls grew up in the Norfolk village of Acle, attending both Acle Primary School and Acle High School, now Acle Academy. She completed her A Level qualifications at East Norfolk Sixth Form College in Gorleston-on-Sea, Norfolk, before completing her BSc in Sports Science with Management at Loughborough University.

Performance timeline

Doubles
Current through the 2023 Australian Open

WTA career finals

Doubles: 2 (1 title, 1 runner-up)

WTA Challenger finals

Doubles: 1 (1 runner-up)

ITF Circuit finals

Doubles: 35 (17 titles, 18 runner–ups)

References

External links
 
 
 

1994 births
Living people
British female tennis players
Universiade medalists in tennis
English female tennis players
Universiade bronze medalists for Great Britain
Medalists at the 2017 Summer Universiade